Elena Anatolyevna Lashmanova (born 9 April 1992 in Saransk, Mordovia) is a Russian race walker. In March 2022, she received a two-year ban, retroactive to March 2021, with all of her results disqualified from February 18, 2012 to January 3, 2014 disqualified for doping use.

Lashmanova was the 2012 Olympic Champion in the 20 km walk. In 2021, she received a two-year ban for a doping violation along with a similar penalty for the majority of her training partners shortly thereafter. Her Olympic gold (at time of writing) will be stripped following an IOC decision in March 2022. It is claimed by Russian whistleblower Rodchenkov that her positive sample (found with the doping compound GW1516) was in fact one from her 2012 Olympics mistakenly substituted for a further positive test result by the state run-doping programme. He claims that she had at least 2 positive findings that went unreported and that this one was reported only because it was witnessed by non-Russian experts.

Biography
In her Olympic debut at the 2012 Summer Olympics in London, Lashmanova won gold in the women's 20 kilometres walk in world record time. However, her Olympic gold (at time of writing) will be stripped for doping following an IOC decision in March 2022. She will also be stripped of her 2013 world title. Russia originally was thought to have won 18 medals and eight gold medals in track and field at the 2012 Olympics. After Lashmanova’s medal is officially stripped, however, Russia's totals will be reduced to seven medals and two gold medals (following many other reallocation for similar reasons).

On 22 June 2014, it was announced that Lashmanova had tested positive for doping with Endurobol, along with a large number of other Russian race-walkers, and would receive a two-year suspension. She would come off of the doping suspension in time to defend her Olympic gold medal. She joined over a dozen other elite Russian race walkers all coached by Viktor Chegin to receive doping suspensions.

She is alleged to have competed on 30 December 2014 despite the drug suspension. If proven her ban could be extended for a further two years.

Her world record was beaten in 2015 by China's Liu Hong.

In March 2022, she received a two-year ban, retroactive to March 2021, with all of her results from February 18, 2012 to January 3, 2014 disqualified for doping use.

International competitions

See also
List of doping cases in athletics

References

External links

1992 births
Living people
People from Saransk
Sportspeople from Mordovia
Russian female racewalkers
Olympic female racewalkers
Olympic athletes of Russia
Olympic gold medalists for Russia
Olympic gold medalists in athletics (track and field)
Athletes (track and field) at the 2012 Summer Olympics
Medalists at the 2012 Summer Olympics
World Athletics Championships athletes for Russia
World Athletics Championships winners
World Athletics Race Walking Team Championships winners
World Athletics U20 Championships winners
World Youth Championships in Athletics winners
Russian Athletics Championships winners
World record setters in athletics (track and field)
Doping cases in athletics
Russian sportspeople in doping cases
21st-century Russian women